Women and Brigands (Italian: Donne e briganti) is a 1950 French-Italian historical melodrama adventure film directed by Mario Soldati and starring Amedeo Nazzari, Maria Mauban and Jean Chevrier. It is based on the story of the legendary guerilla fighter Fra Diavolo, who led a major uprising against French forces in Naples during the Napoleonic Wars. In 1953 it was released in a dubbed version in the United States under the alternative title The King's Guerrillas.

The film was made at the Farnesina Studios in Rome with Location shooting taking place at the Royal Palace of Caserta. The films's sets were designed by the art director Ottavio Scotti. It earned around 206 million lira at the Italian box office.

Cast
Amedeo Nazzari as Michele Pezza/Fra Diavolo
Maria Mauban as Marietta
Jean Chevrier as General Hugo
Paolo Stoppa as Peppino Luciani
Enrico Viarisio as Cardinal Ruffo
Nando Bruno as Beato
Jacqueline Pierreux as Nora
Giuseppe Porelli as Ferdinand IV, King of Naples
Guido Celano as Bourbon Sergeant
Felice Minotti as Furiere Dupont
Virgilio Riento as Friar Marco
Enrico Luzi as sentry
Nino Vingelli as Ciccillo
Ada Dondini as Mother superior
Rina Franchetti as Sister Emilia
 as Guardia al palazzo reale
Anna Maria Canali as Bambina 
Gianni Luda as Brigante

See also
The Adventures of Fra Diavolo (1942)

References

External links

Films scored by Nino Rota
Italian black-and-white films
1950 drama films
Napoleonic Wars films
Melodrama films
Films directed by Mario Soldati
1950s historical films
Italian historical drama films
French historical drama films
Lux Film films
Cultural depictions of Fra Diavolo
1950s Italian films
1950s French films